D-bifunctional protein (DBP), also known as peroxisomal multifunctional enzyme type 2 (MFP-2), as well as 17β-hydroxysteroid dehydrogenase type IV (17β-HSD type IV) is a protein that in humans is encoded by the HSD17B4 gene. It's an alcohol oxidoreductase, specifically 17β-Hydroxysteroid dehydrogenase. It is involved in fatty acid β-oxidation and steroid metabolism (cf. steroidogenesis).

Function 

The HSD17B4 gene encodes an enzyme involved in peroxisomal fatty acid beta-oxidation. It was first identified as a 17-beta-estradiol dehydrogenase (Leenders et al., 1996; van Grunsven et al., 1998). Peroxisomal beta-oxidation of fatty acids, originally described by Lazarow and de Duve (1976), is catalyzed by 3 enzymes: acyl-CoA oxidase (see, e.g., ACOX1, MIM 609751); the 'D-bifunctional enzyme,' with enoyl-CoA hydratase and D-3-hydroxyacyl-CoA dehydrogenase activity, and 3-ketoacyl-CoA thiolase (MIM 604054).

See also the L-bifunctional peroxisomal protein (EHHADH; MIM 607037). The D- and L-bifunctional proteins have different substrate specificities. The D-bifunctional protein catalyzes the formation of 3-ketoacyl-CoA intermediates from both straight-chain and 2-methyl-branched-chain fatty acids and also acts in shortening cholesterol for bile acid formation. In contrast, the L-specific bifunctional protein does not have the latter 2 activities (Jiang et al., 1997).[supplied by OMIM]

See also 
 D-bifunctional protein deficiency
 Perrault syndrome

References

Further reading